Kevin Karplus is a professor emeritus at University of California, Santa Cruz, currently in the Biomolecular Engineering Department.

He is probably best known for work he did as a computer science graduate student at Stanford University on the Karplus-Strong string synthesis algorithm.

He taught VLSI design and computer engineering for several years, helping create the Computer Engineering Department at University of California, Santa Cruz. He made some contributions to VLSI CAD, particularly to logic minimization, where he invented the if-then-else DAG (a generalization of the binary decision diagram) and a canonical form for it, before switching to protein structure prediction and bioinformatics in 1995.

He has participated in CASP (Critical Assessment of Techniques for Protein Structure Prediction) since CASP2 in 1996, and has been invited to present papers at CASP2, 3, 4, 5, 6, 7, and 8.

He served on the Board of Directors for the International Society for Computational Biology January 2005—Jan 2011.

Karplus has long been a bicycle advocate.  In 1994, the League of American Bicyclists gave him the Phyllis W. Harmon Volunteer-of-the-Year Award.
In 2001, he was given a Lifetime Achievement Award by Santa Cruz County Regional Transportation Commission for long standing commitment to improving bicycle transportation in Santa Cruz County.
He was also one of the founding members of People Power, a bicycle advocacy group in Santa Cruz.

References

External links 
 Home page for Kevin Karplus
 List of published papers
 Science Advisory Board bio

University of California, Santa Cruz faculty
Stanford University alumni
1954 births
Living people